Daniel Droste (born 2 April 1980 in Mosbach) is a German musician. He was a member of Midnattsol between 2003 and 2010, and founded Ahab in 2006.

Career 
Droste was the guitarist of the gothic/folk metal band Midnattsol and is the vocalist, guitarist, and keyboardist of the funeral doom band Ahab.

Personal 
Droste also works as a therapist.

Discography

With Penetralia
Schwarz (demo, 1996)
Tribute to the Moon (demo, 1998)
Carpe Noctem - Legends of Fullmoon Empires (full-length, 1999)
Seelenkrank (full-length, 2000)

With Midnattsol
Midnattsol (demo, 2003)
Where Twilight Dwells (full-length, 2005)
Nordlys (full-length, 2008)
The Metamorphosis Melody (full-length, 2011)

With Ahab
"The Stream" (single, 2004)
The Oath (demo, 2005; EP, 2007)
The Call of the Wretched Sea (full-length, 2006)
The Divinity of Oceans (full-length, 2009)
The Giant (full-length, 2012)
The Boats of the Glen Carrig (full-length, 2015)

References

1980 births
Living people
People from Neckar-Odenwald-Kreis
German heavy metal guitarists
German male guitarists
German keyboardists
21st-century German male singers
German multi-instrumentalists
21st-century guitarists